Leo Goodwin Sr. (1886–1971) was a businessman and philanthropist best known for founding GEICO in 1936, with his wife Lillian Goodwin.

Background
Goodwin was born in 1886 in Lowndes, Missouri, the son of a country doctor who traveled by horse and buggy to treat his patients. 
Educated as an accountant, Goodwin entered the insurance business in San Antonio, Texas. As he became more experienced in the field, Goodwin came to the remarkable insight that the industry could better serve its customers and reduce costs by eliminating sales commissions to producers of premiums and dealing directly with policyholders. With this precedent-setting vision in mind, he founded the Government Employees Insurance Company (GEICO) in 1936.
 
With his wife, Lillian, Mr. Goodwin worked 12 hours a day for little or no salary for several years to implement his business dream. In 1940, after operating in the red for several years, the company realized its first profit. In 1948, GEICO became publicly owned and as of 2018 has assets of more than $32 billion.

Professional career and GEICO
He hammered out the basic business plan during his early career days in Texas. In 1936, Goodwin established GEICO operations in Washington, D.C. By the end of 1936, there were 3,700 GEICO policies in force and a total staff of 12 people. He believed that "if he lowered costs in the company by marketing directly to carefully targeted customer groups, he'd be able to pass along lower premiums and still earn a profit". With his wife, Lillian, Mr. Goodwin worked 12 hours a day for little or no salary for several years to implement his business dream. In 1940, after operating in the red for several years, the company realized its first profit. In 1948, GEICO became publicly owned and today has assets of nearly $7.3 billion. Leo Goodwin chose to retire in 1958. In 2001, Leo Goodwin was posthumously named to the Insurance Hall of Fame.

Philanthropy

Leo Goodwin was a large donor to Nova Southeastern University and is considered one of the primary founders. The building that contains the university's law school, Shepard Broad Law Center, is housed in Leo Goodwin Sr. Hall. In addition, one of the dorms is named the Leo Goodwin Sr. Residence Hall. The Law Center is housed in the Leo Goodwin Sr. Hall, which is named for a generous entrepreneur and visionary who was committed to the advancement of education and research.

The Goodwin Foundation carried on the community-minded attitude of Leo Goodwin Sr. after his death. It sponsors a scholarship at Broward Community College.

The Leo Goodwin Sr. Chair in Law was established at Shepard Broad Law Center with an initial gift from the late Leo Goodwin Sr. The Goodwin Chair allows the Law Center to invite distinguished legal scholars to spend time in residence, to team-teach a seminar with a member of the Law Center faculty, and to interact with the Law Center faculty, students, and alumni.

References

20th-century American businesspeople
Nova Southeastern University people
1886 births
1971 deaths
GEICO